is a horror-themed action platform game developed and published by SETA Corporation for the Super Nintendo Entertainment System. It was released in Japan on October 7, 1994, and in North America in October 1995.

The player controls a young man known as Kyle, who rides to the vampire Nosferatu's castle in order to defeat him and save his beloved girlfriend Erin from his clutches.

Plot
The game follows the story of a young man named Kyle who has his girlfriend Erin sequestered with the vampire Nosferatu (in the opening cutscene of the Japanese version, he is also referred to as Count Dracula); he has the objective of obtaining their blood. Kyle then goes up to the castle where Nosferatu lurks with the intent to rescue Erin, but getting there, he discovers that the huge place is full of traps and violent creatures. The game starts with Kyle being trapped in the dungeon of the castle, and the player must escape from there and walk through the castle until they reach the tower where Erin and Nosferatu are.

Gameplay

The game is played like Prince of Persia, however the player fights with his bare fists. Despite that, they can use many unique moves and special combos with attacking. He fights various monsters such as Frankenstein's monsters, zombies, gargoyles and ghosts. The bosses are the Werewolf and Beast Men, amongst others. There are three types of crystals used in the game in addition to an hourglass. Finding an hourglass extends the in-game time. Each crystal has its own abilities: red crystals give players a power-up at every three crystals, green crystals recover the health of the player while the blue crystal extends the player's health bar.

Development and release
Nosferatu was programmed by T. Nakamura, Hiroki Azumada, Yoshihiro Ando and Tetsuo Mochizuki. Kōji Isoda, Kōzō Igarashi and Shingo Aoyama served as graphic designers. Opus Corp handled the audio for the game, with Masanao Akahori composing the music, and Jun Enoki creating the sound effects. Nosferatu was released by SETA Corporation on October 7, 1994, in Japan. This was followed by its North American release in October 1995.

Reception

GamePro judged the game to be a frustratingly difficult but still worthwhile cinematic platformer. They elaborated that the game is frustrating due to the sometimes slow character movements and lack of any password or save function, and that the strong atmosphere and slow-paced, strategic approach are its strong points. Most of the four reviewers of Electronic Gaming Monthly found the graphics and sound to be impressive, but they all complained about frustrations resulting from poor responsiveness in the controls. They all also said that the game was something of a disappointment in light of how long it had spent in development (it was announced before the Super NES launch) and how heavily hyped it had been. Brett Alan Weiss of AllGame praised Nosferatu graphics and audio, making the game "imbued with cinematic style and flair", but criticized its controls. Weiss also derided the game's combat, which he considered "redundant and largely unexciting".

Game Informer magazine gave it an overall score of 6.75.

References

External links

Nosferatu at superfamicom.org
Nosferatu at super-famicom.jp 

1994 video games
Gothic video games
Platform games
Side-scrolling video games
SETA Corporation games
Super Nintendo Entertainment System games
Super Nintendo Entertainment System-only games
Video games about vampires
Video games developed in Japan
Video games set in castles
Video games with rotoscoped graphics
Dark fantasy video games
Single-player video games